Ningerum Rural LLG is a local-level government area situated in North Fly District of Western Province of Papua New Guinea. In the year 2000, the LLG had a population of 13,156 people. The main population centre is Ningerum.

Wards
01. Ambaga
02. Kungim
03. Tengkim
04. Hukim
05. Tarakbits
06. Ogun/Ambaga
07. Kwikim
08. Bankim No. 1
09. Wulimkanatgo
10. Kolebon
11. Wogam
12. Hoirenkia
13. Sisimakam
14. Mohomtienai
15. Runai
16. Hawenai
17. Tmoknai
18. Sonai
19. Pampenai
20. Yenkenai
21. Matkomrae
22. Dande
23. Miamrae
24. Ningerum Station

References

Local-level governments of Western Province (Papua New Guinea)